Mishima: A Life in Four Chapters is a 1985 American biographical drama film based on the life and work of Japanese writer Yukio Mishima, directed by Paul Schrader from a screenplay co-written with his brother Leonard and Leonard's wife Chieko Schrader. The film interweaves episodes from Mishima's (Ken Ogata) life with dramatizations of segments from his books The Temple of the Golden Pavilion, Kyoko's House, and Runaway Horses. Francis Ford Coppola and George Lucas were executive producers of the film, which has a musical score composed by Philip Glass and production design by Eiko Ishioka.

Plot
The film sets in on November 25, 1970, the last day in Mishima's life. He is shown finishing a manuscript. Then, he puts on a uniform he designed for himself and meets with four of his most loyal followers from his private army.

In flashbacks highlighting episodes from his past life, the viewer sees Mishima's progression from a sickly young boy to one of Japan's most acclaimed writers of the post-war era (who in adulthood trains himself into the acme of muscular discipline, owing to a morbid and militaristic obsession with masculinity and physical culture). His loathing for the materialism of modern Japan has him turn towards an extremist traditionalism. He sets up his own private army and proclaims the reinstating of the emperor as head of government.

The biographical sections are interwoven with short dramatizations of three of Mishima's novels: In The Temple of the Golden Pavilion, a stuttering aspirant sets fire to the famous Zen Buddhist temple because he feels inferior at the sight of its beauty. Kyoko's House depicts the sadomasochistic (and ultimately fatal) relationship between a middle-aged woman and her young lover, who is in her financial debt. In Runaway Horses, a group of young fanatic nationalists fails to overthrow the government, with its leader subsequently committing suicide. Dramatizations, frame story, and flashbacks are segmented into the four chapters of the film's title, named Beauty, Art, Action, and Harmony of Pen and Sword.

The film culminates in Mishima and his followers taking hostage a General of the Japan Self-Defense Forces. He addresses the garrison's soldiers, asking them to join him in his struggle to reinstate the Emperor as the nation's sovereign. His speech is largely ignored and ridiculed. Mishima then returns to the General's office and commits seppuku.

Cast

November 25, 1970

Ken Ogata as Yukio Mishima
Masayuki Shionoya as Masakatsu Morita
Junkichi Orimoto as General Kanetoshi Mashita
Hiroshi Mikami as Cadet #1 
Junya Fukuda as Cadet #2 
Shigeto Tachihara as Cadet #3

Flashbacks

Naoko Otani as Shizue Hiraoka 
Haruko Kato as Natsuko Hiraoka
Yuki Kitazume as Dancing Friend 
Kyûzô Kobayashi as Literary Friend 
Alan Mark Poul as American Reporter 
Roy Scheider as Narrator (voice)
Paul Jasmin as Narrator (uncredited, voice)

The Temple of the Golden Pavilion

Yasosuke Bando as Mizoguchi
Kōichi Satō as Kashiwagi
Hisako Manda as Mariko
Chishū Ryū as Monk
Naomi Oki as First Girl
Miki Takakura as Second Girl

Kyoko's House

Kenji Sawada as Osamu
Reisen Lee as Kiyomi
Setsuko Karasuma as Mitsuko
Sachiko Hidari as Osamu's Mother
Tadanori Yokoo as Natsuo
Yasuaki Kurata as Takei

Runaway Horses

Toshiyuki Nagashima as Isao
Hiroshi Katsuno as Lieutenant Hori
Jun Negami as Kurahara
Hiroki Ida as Izutsu
Naoya Makoto as Kendo Instructor
Ryō Ikebe as Interrogater

Production

Mishima dramatizes three of the writer's novels and also uses segments from his autobiographical novel Confessions of a Mask. At least two scenes, one showing the young Mishima being aroused by a painting of the Christian martyr Sebastian, and another where a young Mishima purposefully exaggerates his illness at a military draft health checkup, appear in this book.

The use of one further Mishima novel, Forbidden Colors, which describes the marriage of a homosexual man to a woman, was denied by Mishima's widow. As Schrader wanted to visualize a book illustrating Mishima's narcissism and sexual ambiguity, he chose the novel Kyoko's House (which he had translated for him exclusively) instead. Kyoko's House contains four equally ranking storylines, featuring four protagonists, but Schrader picked out only the one which he considered relevant.

Mishima used various colour palettes to differentiate between frame story, flashbacks and scenes from Mishima's novels: the scenes set in 1970 were shot in naturalistic colours, the flashbacks in black-and-white, the Temple of the Golden Pavilion-episode is dominated by golden and green, Kyoko's House by pink and grey, and Runaway Horses by orange and black.

Pre-production began in February 1984. Cinematographer John Bailey instructed the Japanese crew to set up a screening of Hideo Gosha's film Goyokin, which was screened as an important reference for the "look" of the film.

Roy Scheider was the narrator in the original movie version and on the early VHS release. On the 2001 DVD release, Scheider's voice-over was substituted with a narration by an uncredited actor. The 2008 DVD re-release contains both Scheider's and the alternate narration (plus Ken Ogata's for the Japanese version). In a commentary on Amazon.com, Schrader explained this was a manufacturing error in 2001 and that the voice belonged to the photographer Paul Jasmin.

The film closes with Mishima's suicide (which actually took longer than the seppuku ritual dictates). His confidant Morita, unable to behead Mishima, also failed in killing himself according to the ritual. A third group member beheaded both, then the conspirators surrendered without resistance. Roger Ebert approved of Schrader's decision not to show the suicide in bloody detail, which he thought would have destroyed the film's mood.

The film was withdrawn from the Tokyo International Film Festival and never officially released in Japan, mostly due to boycott exercised by Mishima's widow and threats by far right wing groups opposed to Mishima's portrayal as a homosexual. The title role was originally intended for Ken Takakura, who indeed proposed this to Paul Schrader, but had to withdraw due to the pressure from the same groups. In an interview with Kevin Jackson published in 1992, Schrader commented on the fact that his film has still not been shown in Japan: "[Mishima] is too much of a scandal. ... When Mishima died people said, 'Give us fifteen years and we'll tell you what we think about him,' but it's been more than fifteen years now and they still don't know what to say. Mishima has become a non-subject." 

Schrader considers Mishima the best film he has directed. "It's the one I'd stand by – as a screenwriter it's Taxi Driver, but as a director it's Mishima."

Music

The musical score for Mishima was composed by Philip Glass, with parts performed by the Kronos Quartet. A soundtrack album was released on vinyl record and Audio CD in 1985 by Nonesuch Records.

Reception

Critical response
On review aggregator website Rotten Tomatoes, Mishima has  approval rating and an average rating of  based on  reviews. The website's critical consensus reads, "If Paul Schrader’s Yukio Mishima biopic omits too much to fully depict the author’s life, its passion shines through in its avant-garde structure, Eiko Ishioka’s production design, and Philip Glass’ thunderous score." In his 2013 movie guide, Leonard Maltin called the film an "ambitious, highly stylized drama", later adding that it is "long, difficult, not always successful, but fascinating." In 2007, Roger Ebert added the film to his "Great Movies" list, calling the film "a triumph of concise writing and construction. The unconventional structure of the film ... unfolds with perfect clarity, the logic revealing itself."

Chris Peachment of Time Out Film Guide said, "Schrader may have finally achieved the violent transfiguration that he seeks along with his protagonists; the film has all the ritual sharpness and beauty of that final sword. ... There is nothing quite like it."

Awards
The film premiered at the 1985 Cannes Film Festival on May 15, 1985, where it won the award for Best Artistic Contribution.

Home media
Mishima has been released three times on DVD in the US, two of which by The Criterion Collection who also produced its   Blu-ray release.
The 2001 Warner Bros. release included a behind-the-scenes documentary, an audio commentary by Paul Schrader and a deleted scene. This edition did not, like the theatrical version, feature the narration of Roy Scheider but of an uncredited actor.
The 2008 Criterion Collection release offered both English narrations by Roy Scheider and (according to Paul Schrader) Paul Jasmin from the 2001 release. Also, it featured new audio commentaries, video interviews with the film makers and experts on the writings of Mishima, plus The Strange Case of Yukio Mishima, a BBC documentary about the author.
The 2018 Criterion Collection re-release on both DVD and Blu-Ray offered a new, restored 4K digital transfer of the director's cut, supervised and approved by director Paul Schrader and cinematographer John Bailey, with 2.0 surround DTS-HD Master Audio soundtrack.  Existing features from the 2008 Criterion release were carried over with the addition of a new booklet featuring an essay by critic Kevin Jackson, a piece on the film's censorship in Japan, and photographs of Ishioka's sets.

A French DVD was released by Wild Side Video in 2010 titled Mishima – une vie en quatre chapitres in Japanese, English and French language with French subtitles.

A Spanish Blu-ray Disc was released in 2010 titled Mishima – Una Vida en Cuatro Capítulos. It features Scheider's narration with optional Spanish and Catalan, but no English, subtitles.

See also 
 11:25 The Day He Chose His Own Fate, a 2012 Japanese film by Kōji Wakamatsu about Mishima's last months and death.

References

External links

Mishima: Pen and Sword an essay by Kevin Jackson at the Criterion Collection

1985 films
American biographical drama films
American LGBT-related films
1985 drama films
Films scored by Philip Glass
Films directed by Paul Schrader
Films about suicide
1980s Japanese-language films
American Zoetrope films
Lucasfilm films
Warner Bros. films
Films set in 1970
Films set in Japan
Films set in Kyoto
Films based on works by Yukio Mishima
Films based on literature
1985 LGBT-related films
Films with screenplays by Paul Schrader
Films based on multiple works
Biographical films about writers
1980s English-language films
1980s American films